Characteristic curve may refer to:

 In electronics, a current–voltage characteristic curve
 Semiconductor curve tracer, a device for displaying the above curve
 In photography, a plot of film density: see sensitometry
 In mathematics, used in the method of characteristics for solving partial differential equations.